Richard Matlack Cooper (February 29, 1768 – March 10, 1843) was a Representative from New Jersey.

He completed a preparatory course of studies; was engaged in banking; was a coroner 1795–1799; judge and justice of Gloucester County courts 1803–1823; a member of the State general assembly 1807–1810; president of the State Bank of New Jersey at Camden 1813–1842; elected as an Anti- Jacksonian to the Twenty-first and Twenty-second Congresses (March 4, 1829 – March 4, 1833); declined to be a candidate for reelection; died in Camden, New Jersey, March 10, 1843. He is interred in the Newton Burying Ground.

References

1768 births
1843 deaths
People from Gloucester County, New Jersey
Members of the New Jersey General Assembly
National Republican Party members of the United States House of Representatives from New Jersey